Darshan is a word meaning "sight" or "viewing" and it may refer to:

 Darshan (Indian religions), the auspicious sight of a Hindu or Buddhist divine image, or a holy person. Alternatively it means the study of particular religious texts or philosophies
 Darshan (Judaism), an ordained Jewish lay leader that serves as a para-rabbi in synagogues and independent minyan 
 Jharokha Darshan ("balcony viewing"), the display of an Indian ruler to his court or the public

Darshan may also refer to:

People 
 Darshan (actor) (born 1977), Indian actor working in Kannada film industry
 Darshan (video game player) (born 1994)

Titled works 
Darshan (1967 film), a East Pakistani film
 Darshan (The Road to Graceland), a 1993 album by David Sylvian and Robert Fripp
 Darshan, a 1997 album by Shehzad Roy

Other
 Darshan (band), an American Jewish hip hop group
 , a tourist attraction in Pune
 Darshana railway station
 A type of maggid, a traditional Eastern European Jewish religious itinerant preacher

People with the given name
 Darshan Kang (born 1951), Canadian politician
 Darshan Punshi, Pakistani politician, active from 2008
 Darshan Ranganathan (1941–2001), chemist from India
 Darshan Singh (executioner), Singaporean executioner
 Darshan Singh (field hockey) (born 1938), former Indian field hockey player
 Darshan Singh Awara (1906–1982), Indian poet
 Darshan Singh Canadian (1917–1986), Sikh trade union activist and Communist organizer

See also
 Darshan Singh (disambiguation)
 Darshanas, the philosophies of Hinduism